The Modern Maximum refers to the period of relatively high solar activity which began with solar cycle 15 in 1914. It reached a maximum in solar cycle 19 during the late 1950s and may have ended with the peak of solar cycle 23 in 2000, as solar cycle 24 is recording, at best, very muted solar activity. Another proposed end date for the maximum is 2007, with the decline phase of Cycle 23. In any case the low solar activity of solar cycle 24 in the 2010s marked a new period of reduced solar activity.

This maximum period is a natural example of solar variation, and one of many that are known from proxy records of past solar variability. The Modern Maximum reached a double peak once in the 1950s and again during the 1990s. For example, Scientists theorized that the Modern Solar Maximum which occurred in 1950-1980 brought a significant cooling phase through parts of the North Atlantic region with Greenland experiencing a major cooling cycle. During this particular Modern Solar Maximum, scientists stated that the sun had a very high solar activity during this time.

References

20th century
2000s
Solar phenomena